The discography of Moheener Ghoraguli, a Bengali rock band, consists of three studio albums, four compilation album, and one extended play albums. The band released three albums in vinyl during their music timeline from 1976-1981.

Formed in 1976, Moheener Ghoraguli initially failed to recognition for their rock music, and, as they evolved, for their Bengali folk-rock and Jazz music. They are known for poetic and philosophical lyrics, innovative cover art, and untraditional live shows.

As a Bengali rock band led by Gautam Chattopadhyay in the late 1970s, Moheener Ghoraguli had few mainstream success after their revival and were one of the most popular bands in the rock music scene of West Bengal.

Artwork
Moheener Ghoraguli albums feature distinctive artwork and do not feature the band members. Shongbigno Pakhikul O Kolkata Bishayak was designed by Ranjon Ghoshal in collaboration with Sarmistha Chatterjee and Sangeeta Ghosal.

Albums

EPs

Single albums

Collaboration albums

References

Source

External links

Discography
Discographies of Indian artists
Rock music group discographies